Kvam is a municipality in Vestland county, Norway. The municipality is located along the Hardangerfjorden in the traditional district of Hardanger. The administrative centre of the municipality is the village of Norheimsund. Other larger settlements in the municipality include Øystese, Bru, Ålvik, Tørvikbygd, Omastranda, and Mundheim. Historically, the municipality was named Vikør.

The  municipality is the 188th largest by area out of the 356 municipalities in Norway. Kvam is the 126th most populous municipality in Norway with a population of 8,497.

General information

Name
The Old Norse form of the name was Hvammr, identical with the word hvammr which means "(small) valley", possibly referring the Steinsdalen valley west of Norheimsund.  Before 1911, the municipality was named Vikør, which comes from the Old Norse word Vikøyar. It was the name of the farm on which the old Vikøy Church was located.

Coat of arms
The coat of arms was granted on 27 November 1981. The blue and silver arms are designed to look like the Fyksesund, a narrow fjord in the municipality. The shape of the fjord is that it is narrower in the middle and this is symbolized in the design of the coat-of-arms.

Churches
The Church of Norway has four parishes within the municipality of Kvam. It is part of the Hardanger og Voss prosti (deanery) in the Diocese of Bjørgvin.

Geography

Kvam municipality borders the municipality of Voss to the north and east; Vaksdal, Samnanger, and Bjørnafjorden to the west; and the Hardangerfjorden to the south. The Fyksesund fjord branches off the main fjord and heads north into the municipality. The Fyksesund Landscape Park surrounds the inner part of the Fyksesund, north of the Fyksesund Bridge. The largest lakes are Bjølsegrøvvatnet and Holmavatnet. In addition a portion of Hamlagrøvatnet is located in Kvam. The Kvamskogen plateau lies west of Norheimsund and is home to hundreds of holiday cabins. The Steinsdalsfossen waterfall, located in Steine is one of the most visited tourist attractions in Norway.

History
{{Historical populations
|footnote = Source: Statistics Norway.
|shading = off
|1951|5530
|1960|6525
|1970|9017
|1980|8733
|1990|8773
|2000|8592
|2010|8360
|2019|8441	  	  	  	  	  	  	  	  	
}}

The old parish of Vikør'' was established as a municipality on 1 January 1838 (see formannskapsdistrikt law). According to the 1835 census, the parish had a population of 2,321.  On 1 January 1882, a small area of Ullensvang municipality (population: 22) was transferred to Vikør. In 1912, the municipality changed its name from "Vikør" to "Kvam".
 
During the 1960s, there were many municipal mergers across Norway due to the work of the Schei Committee. On 1 January 1965, the Åsgrenda area on the Folgefonna peninsula (population: 61) was moved from Kvam to the neighboring Ullensvang Municipality. On the same date, Kvam also gained a considerable amount of territory, making it a much larger municipality. The following places were merged, giving the new Kvam municipality a population of 9,119.
 Most of Kvam municipality (population: 6,759) except for Åsegrenda which was moved to Ullensvang
 The part of Jondal municipality that was located on the northwest side of the Hardangerfjord, around the village of Tørvikbygd (population: 515)
 Most of Strandebarm municipality (population: 1,545), except for the Kysnesstranda area which went to Jondal
 The Mundheim area of Varaldsøy (population: 300).

Government
All municipalities in Norway, including Kvam, are responsible for primary education (through 10th grade), outpatient health services, senior citizen services, unemployment and other social services, zoning, economic development, and municipal roads. The municipality is governed by a municipal council of elected representatives, which in turn elect a mayor.  The municipality falls under the Haugaland og Sunnhordland District Court and the Gulating Court of Appeal.

In 2007, Kvam participated in a trial where the mayor was directly elected. The sitting mayor, Astrid Selsvold, won the election with 26.7% of the votes.

Municipal council
The municipal council of Kvam is made up of 27 representatives that are elected to four year terms. The party breakdown of the council is as follows:

Mayor
The mayors of Kvam (incomplete list):
2019–present: Torgeir Næss (Ap)
2015-2019: Jostein Ljones (Sp)
2011-2015: Asbjørn Tolo (H)
2003-2011: Astrid Farestveit Selsvold (Ap)

Notable residents

 Johannes Skaar (1828 in Øystese – 1904)  Bishop of the Diocese of Nidaros
 Jon Flatabø (1846 in Kvam – 1930) a Norwegian writer of popular literature
 Nils Nilsson Skaar (1852 in Kvam – 1948) a Norwegian teacher, farmer, editor and politician
 Ingebrigt Vik (1867 in Øystese – 1927) a distinguished Norwegian sculptor
 Jakob Nilsson Vik (1882 in Kvam – 1960) a Norwegian farmer, dairy manager and politician
 Svein Rosseland (1894 in Kvam – 1985) an astrophysicist, pioneered theoretical astrophysics
 Geirr Tveitt (1908–1981) a Norwegian composer and pianist, family in Kvam
 Gunnar Aksnes (1926 in Kvam — 2010) a Norwegian chemist and poet
 Magnus Midtbø (1942 in Ålvik – 2010) a Norwegian trade unionist and politician
 Kaj Skagen (born 1949 in Strandebarm) a Norwegian writer
 Nils Gunnar Lie (born 1950 in Øystese) a Norwegian television personality
 Torill Selsvold Nyborg (born 1952 in Kvam) a nurse, missionary and politician 
 Valgerd Svarstad Haugland (born 1956 in Kvam) a teacher, politician and civil servant
 Geir Botnen (born 1959 in Kvam) a Norwegian pianist
 Gisle Torvik (born 1975 in Tørvikbygd) a Norwegian jazz musician, plays guitar
 Torstein Lofthus (born 1977 in Øystese) a Norwegian drummer and composer
 Frank Kjosås (born 1981 in Øystese) a Norwegian actor of theatre and film

Sport 
 Knut Hjeltnes (born 1951 in Øystese) college coach, former shot-putter and discus thrower
 Kirsten Melkevik Otterbu (born 1970 in Øystese) a Norwegian marathon runner
 Torgeir Børven (born 1991 in Øystese) a Norwegian footballer with over 240 club caps

References

External links

Municipal fact sheet from Statistics Norway 

 
Municipalities of Vestland
1838 establishments in Norway